Ayothaya Floating Market is a cultural and shopping destination in Phra Nakhon Si Ayutthaya Province, central Thailand. It is not more than 2 hrs from Bangkok by car and train.

Ayothaya Floating Market located at 65/12, Mu 7, Ayothaya, Tambon Phai Ling, Amphoe Phra Nakhon Si Ayutthaya close to Ayutthaya Railway Station and Wat Maheyong, operated since May 2, 2010.

This market is different from other floating markets, where it is an artificial floating market. It is not an authentic floating market like Damnoen Saduak or Amphawa Floating Markets. But it has an interesting identity are traditional Thai wooden houses lined along waterways and female vendors who dress in traditional Thai clothes with a perform about the history of the Ayutthaya War four rounds per day, only on weekends and public holidays. It has an area of about 80 rai (about 31 acres) divided into zones, which each zone is named after the amphoes (districts) and renowned markets of Phra Nakhon Si Ayutthaya. 

Interesting and distinctive goods here are a variety of Thai food especially sweets, souvenir t-shirts, home decorations, traditional Thai toys etc. Moreover, visitors can also take a boat around the market or ride an elephant to visit nearby historical sites.

The market is open daily from 9.00 am until 6.00 pm.

References

External links

Floating markets in Thailand
Tourist attractions in Phra Nakhon Si Ayutthaya province
2010 establishments in Thailand